The Coronet large cent was a type of large cent issued by the United States Mint at the Philadelphia Mint from 1816 until 1839. 

There are two similar designs of the Coronet large cent, the Matron Head and the Braided Hair, the latter with a slightly altered profile. This was the last large cent produced by the mint, being replaced by the reduced diameter Flying Eagle cent in 1857.

History
During the War of 1812, a trade embargo was imposed between the United States and England, which had supplied the US Mint with copper planchets. The mint's supply was exhausted in 1814, and no Classic Head cents were produced dated 1815. It has often been written that no cents at all were struck that year, but coinage did resume in December of 1815 using an 1814 or 1816-dated die.

Once the embargo was lifted and the mint received new planchets, large cent production resumed, this time with a new design of the goddess Liberty by Robert Scot. The design change was made because the Classic Head cents received much criticism.

In 1823, only proof cents were produced during the calendar year, all others were made in 1824 using back-dated dies.

The new cents, known as Matron Head cents, were not much better, however, and numismatist Walter H. Breen called the design "a spectacularly ugly head of Ms. Liberty". In 1836, Christian Gobrecht made several modifications to the design, giving the bust of Liberty a younger appearance.

Gobrecht made further changes in 1839, creating the "Petite Head" Braided Hair cent. In 1843, the bust was enlarged and tilted upward, this design is known as the "Mature Head".

Varieties

Matron Head varieties

Braided Hair varieties

Replacement

The price of copper rose dramatically in the late-1840s, and the cost of producing large cents rose as a result. The US Mint started seeking an alternative that used less copper. The first attempt was to perforate the coin, resulting in the ring cents of 1850 and 1851. The standard composition of these coins was billon, an alloy of 90% copper and 10% silver. This coin was not placed into production as it was expensive to extract the silver from the alloy, and the coins were difficult to eject from the dies. Additionally, a drop in the price of copper temporarily eliminated the need to replace the large cent.

The price of copper rose again in the mid-1850s, and the mint again looked for an alternative cent. This time, the cent was reduced in size, only a little larger than a dime. Patterns for the Flying Eagle cent were struck in 1854, and proved to be a suitable replacement for the large cent. The small cent was approved for production in 1856, and several thousand 1856 Flying Eagle cents were sold to collectors. Full-scale production commenced in mid-1857, replacing the large cent last struck earlier that year.

In 1868, eleven years after the last large cent was produced, a mint employee struck around a dozen and a half large cents dated 1868. These coins were struck in both copper and nickel planchets. Also produced that year were about 2 dozen dime patterns were minted in nickel with the obverse die of the 1868 large cent, plus an additional 2 dozen pieces struck in copper.

See also
Silver center cent
Chain cent
Wreath cent
Liberty Cap cent
Draped Bust cent
Classic Head cent
Ring cent
Flying Eagle cent
Indian Head cent
Lincoln cent

References

1816 introductions
Coins of the United States
Historical currencies of the United States
One-cent coins
Goddess of Liberty on coins